is a single released by Miyavi on January 16, 2008. The title track features fellow S.K.I.N. member, Sugizo, as a guest guitarist. The single contains three tracks on the regular edition, while the special edition has only the first two tracks, although the limited editions includes a bonus DVD with the music video and making-of footage. It charted 10th on Oricon and 11th on Billboard Japan.

Track listing

Personnel
 Miyavi – vocals and lyrics, acoustic and electric guitar, tambourine, gigpig, producer
 Sugizo – electric guitar (Track 1 & 3) (special guest)
 Tyko – MC, beatbox, rapping
 DJ 1, 2 – turntable
 Masahide Sakuma – bass guitar
 Soul Toul – drums
 Tsuyoshi Inoue – Music video director (DVD track 1)
 Ryo Nagai – director (DVD track 2)
 Kavki Boiz – music video cast and performers
 Masahide Sakuma – producer
 Tomomi Ozaki – executive producer
 Atsushi Kitamura – executive producer
 Kei Ishizaka – general producer
 Noriyuki Kisou – recording engineer, mixing engineer
 Ue Nastasi – mastering engineer

References

2008 singles
Miyavi songs
2008 songs